EBK may refer to
 DJ EBK (born 1978), British musician
 Eastbrook railway station, in Wales
 Eastern Bontoc language
 Ecobank Kenya
 École Belge de Kigali, a Belgian school in Rwanda
 Einstein–Brillouin–Keller method
 Ertebølle culture, a Mesolithic culture of Europe
 Esbo Bollklubb, a Finnish football club
 Swiss Federal Banking Commission